Glycine clandestina, commonly known as twining glycine or love creeper, is a scrambling plant in the bean family, found in Australia.

References 

clandestina
Flora of New South Wales
Flora of Queensland
Flora of Victoria (Australia)
Flora of South Australia
Flora of Tasmania